Hesperia dacotae, the Dakota skipper, is a small to medium-sized North American butterfly. It has a wingspan of approximately one inch and the antennae form a hook. The male's wings are a tawny-orange to brown on the forewings with a prominent mark and dusty yellow on the lower part of the wing. The female wing is a darker brown orange and white spots on the forewing margin.

Reproduction
The adult Dakota skippers are active for only three weeks in June and July which is their total lifespan. Their eggs, which are laid on the underside of leaves, are hatched in July and the caterpillar larvae feed on native grass until they go dormant in late summer. The caterpillar larvae then winter in shelters very close to the ground. In spring they come out of dormancy in their adult form. They are found in healthy natural tall grass and prairie grass from Minnesota to Saskatchewan. They are now considered extirpated from Illinois and Iowa. The largest most stable population is now found in North Dakota.

Conservation
The Dakota skipper has experienced declining populations from destruction and modification of native prairie for grazing, herbicide use and building. The U.S. Fish and Wildlife Service placed the Dakota skipper on the Candidate list for protections under the Endangered Species Act from 1975 to 2014, and it has been petitioned twice for protection under the Endangered Species Act in 1994 and 2003. The Dakota skipper was awarded Threatened status under the Endangered Species Act in 2014.

References

External links
Dakota skipper (Hesperia dacotae)
U.S. Fish and Wildlife Service 
Endangered insects (pdf)
FWS Field Office
Species at risk

Hesperia (butterfly)
Butterflies of North America
Butterflies described in 1758
Taxa named by Carl Linnaeus
ESA threatened species